Perhaps the most accurate and current data on homelessness in the United States is reported annually by the Department of Housing and Urban Development (HUD) in the Annual Homeless Assessment Report to Congress (AHAR). The AHAR report relies on data from two sources: single-night, point-in-time counts of both sheltered and unsheltered homeless populations reported on the Continuum of Care applications to HUD; and counts of the sheltered homeless population over a full year provided by a sample of communities based on data in their local Homeless Management Information Systems (HMIS).

Sample results from the 2010 AHAR 
The sixth report to Congress, the 2010 AHAR, released in July 2011, reports the following household and demographic information for people that had accessed emergency shelters and transitional housing between October 2009 and September 2010, based on a sampling of HMIS data:

Total Number 
About 1.59 million people were homeless in emergency shelters or transitional housing at some point during the year between October 1, 2009 and September 30, 2010. The nation’s sheltered homeless population over a year’s time included approximately 1,092,600 individuals (68 percent) and 516,700 persons in families (32 percent). A family is a household that includes an adult 18 years of age or older and at least one child. All other sheltered homeless people are considered individuals.

Ethnicity 
 83.6% are Non-Hispanic/Non-Latino
 16.4% are Hispanic/Latino

Race 
 41.6% are White, non-Hispanic/Latino
 9.7% are White, Hispanic/Latino
 37.0% are Black or African American
 4.5% Other Single Race
 7.2% Multiple Races

Age 
 21.8% Under age 18
 23.5% are 18 to 30
 37% are 31 to 50
 14.9% are 51 to 61
 2.8% are 62 and older

Household Size 
 63.0% are in a 1 person household
 10.1% are in a household of 2 people 
 10.4% are in a household of 3 people
 8.1% are in a household of 4 people
 8.4% are in a household of 5 or more people

Veteran Status 
 11.6% are veterans
 88.4% are not veterans

Disability Status (adults only)
 36.8% are disabled
 63.2% are not disabled

Living Situation Prior to Program Entry 
Already Homeless:
 14.1% were in a place not meant for human habitation
 25.0% were in emergency shelter
From 'Housing', newly homeless:
 11.8% were in a rented or owned housing unit
 17.6% were staying with family
 12.6% were staying with friends
From Institutional Settings:
 6.4% were in a psychiatric facility, substance abuse center or  hospital (nonpsychiatric)
 4.4% were in a jail, prison, or juvenile detention
 0.2% were in a foster care home
Total Other:
 7.9% were in a hotel or motel (no voucher)

Stability of Previous Night’s Living Arrangement 
 20.6% stayed 1 week or less
 15.4% stayed more than 1 week, but less than a month
 21.6% stayed 1 to 3 months
 16.0% stayed more than 3 months, but less than a year
 26.4% stayed 1 year or longer

ZIP Code of Last Permanent Address 
 62.5% came from the same jurisdiction as program location
 37.6% came from a different jurisdiction than program location

The 2008 AHAR also reports the following counts and household information of sheltered and unsheltered homeless persons nationwide on a single night in January 2008, based on the Point-In-Time data collected as part of the 2008 Continuum of Care Application:

Total Number 
On a single night in January 2008, there were 664,414 sheltered and unsheltered homeless persons nationwide. Nearly 6 in 10 people who were homeless at a single point-in-time were in emergency shelters or transitional housing programs, while 42 percent were unsheltered on the “street” or in other places not meant for human habitation.

Homeless Individuals 
 415,202 total individuals
 49.3% are sheltered
 50.7% are unsheltered

Homeless Persons in Families 
 249,212 total persons in families
 72.8% are sheltered
 27.2% are unsheltered

Chronically Homeless 
 124,135 total chronically homeless persons
 37% are sheltered
 63% are unsheltered

Other Sheltered Subpopulations 
 34.7% are chronic substance abusers
 26.2% are severely mentally ill
 15.1% are veterans
 12.3% are victims of domestic violence
 3.9% are persons with HIV/AIDS (adults only)
 1.1% are unaccompanied youth

References

Further reading 
 Karash, Robert L., "Who is Homeless? The HUD Annual Report to Congress and Homelessness Pulse Project", Spare Change News, Boston, June 18, 2010

External links 
 HUD, "5th Annual Homeless Assessment Report to Congress (2009)", June 2010.
 HUD, "6th Annual Homeless Assessment Report to Congress (2010)", June 2011.

Homelessness in the United States